Karekin II may refer to:

Karekin II Kazanjian of Constantinople (1927–1998), the 83rd Armenian Patriarch of Constantinople
Karekin II (Karekin I Sarkissian) (1932–1999), Catholicos of Cilicia and later, as Karekin I, Patriarch and Catholicos of All Armenians
Karekin II (Karekin II Nersessian) (born 1951), current Patriarch and Catholicos of All Armenians

See also
Garegin (disambiguation) / Karekin (disambiguation)
Karekin I (disambiguation)